Charlie Turner (born 30 November 1910, date of death unknown) was an Irish soccer international footballer.

Biography
Turner was a centre half and was capped 10 times for the Republic of Ireland at senior level. Turner was signed by Leeds as a twenty-one-year-old from Stalybridge Celtic in May 1933 but played mainly in the reserves before transferring to Southend United in June 1935. He made 99 league appearances at Southend before leaving for West Ham United during the 1937–38 season.

He only made 11 league appearances for the Hammers before joining Hartlepool United at the beginning of the 1939–40 season. The Second World War intervened, however, before he ever got to play for Hartlepool. After the war, he moved back to Ireland where he was made player-coach of Waterford in the League of Ireland before leaving them to manage Shelbourne in 1946.

References

External links
 Profile from soccerscene.ie
 
 Leeds United history profile
 westhamstats.info profile

1910 births
Republic of Ireland association footballers
Republic of Ireland international footballers
West Ham United F.C. players
Southend United F.C. players
Leeds United F.C. players
Association football central defenders
Stalybridge Celtic F.C. players
Waterford F.C. players
Shelbourne F.C. managers
Year of death unknown
Irish association football managers